Supertitlán is a Mexican television sitcom adapted from the American series Superstore, created by Justin Spitzer. It premiered on Azteca 7 on 30 May 2022. Starring an ensemble cast headed by Jesús Zavala and Sofía Espinosa, Supertitlán follows a group of employees working at a supermarket in Tacubaya, Mexico City.

Cast

Main 
 Jesús Zavala as Jonás Encinas
 Sofía Espinosa as Amelia "Amy"
 Luz Aldán as Diana
 Aldo Escalante as Juan
 Ricardo Peralta as Mateo
 Erika Franco as Michelle
 Azalia Ortiz as Sandra
 Carlos Orozco Plascencia as Gervasio Cárdenas
 Amanda Farah as Remedios
 Laura de Ita as Lola
 Rubén Herrera Díaz as Rafael "Rafita"
 Eugenio Rubio as Adonis
 Harold Azuara as José Daniel "Yoshi"
 Juan Ugarte as Marcos
 Martín Barba as Byron
 Carmen Ramos as Pascualina
 Roberta Burns as Carolina
 Concepción Márquez as Mirta
 Nuria Blanco as Justina

Recurring and guest stars 

 Hamlet Ramírez as Don Güero
 Miguel Gutiérrez as Roman
 Alfredo Jímenez as Adonay "Cara de bébe"
 Mauricio Guzmán as Rogelio "Jefe Apache"
 Paola Izquierdo as Lady Pañales
 Samadhi Domínguez as Alicia
 Daniel Resendíz as Daniel
 Talía Loaria as The thief
 Pascal Nadaud as Mascot instructor
 Omar Villegas as Carlos "Chato"
 Anna Elia García as Mother Severa
 Maribel Quero as Sister Dina
 Emma Escalante as The assistant
 Ana Celeste Montalvo as Emma Ramírez Sosa
 Paulina Gil as Wendy Power
 Lorenzo Pérez as Agustín
 Francisco de la Reguera as Darío del Risco
 Juan Carlos Remolina as José Encinas
 Cristina Montero as Lidia
 Pablo Perroni as Gilberto
 Diana Carreiro as Julieta
 Karla Farfán as Daniela
 Lucrecia Monje as Mother Granja
 Emiliano Camacho as Aguirre
 Lizzy Auna as Nadia
 Sergio Velasco as Paco del Oso
 Bárbara Turbay as Laura Rosas
 Audrey Moreno as Mercedes
 Pilar Flores del Valle as Nazareth
 Adriana Cadeña as Nezareth
 Francisco Calvillo as Pedro Villafuerte
 Carlos Barragán as Jesús
 Mercedes Vaughan as Consuelo
 Alfredo Gatica as Miguel Ramírez
 Aquiles Cervantes as José Carlos
 Marcelia Baetens as Real estate agent
 Christopher Arzarate as Rescuer
 Abraham Jurado as Felipe
 Viviana Serna as Kelly
 Claudia Santiago as History teacher

Episodes

Production 
On 22 February 2021, it was reported that a Spanish-language adaptation of the American sitcom Superstore was in development, titled Supertitlan. Filming took place from July to November 2021. On 1 November 2021, the main cast was announced. The series premiered on 30 May 2022. The series consists of 48 episodes.

Ratings 
 
}}

References

External links 
 

2020s Mexican television series
2022 Mexican television series debuts
Television series by TV Azteca
Mexican television series
Mexican television series based on American television series
Mexican LGBT-related television shows